Aaron is a village in the Nkhotakota District of Central Region, Malawi, located on the western shore of Lake Malawi. The town was named after the biblical prophet Aaron, by Christian missionaries.

References

External links
 Satellite map at Maplandia.com
 Aaron, Malawi weather

Populated places in Central Region, Malawi